Fun Channel is a Bahraini television channel owned by the Orbit Network. Fun Channel contains cartoons for children from early morning to evening such as The Why Why Family and Dennis the Menace. From late night to early morning, it contains shows for pre-teens and older such as California Dreams and Hang Time.

Between 2005 and 2010, it used to simulcast Jetix Play.

History 
Launched in 1994, Fun Channel broadcasts family-friendly entertainment, including animated and live action shows. On April 14, 2004 Fun Channel changed its logo and added more animated shows to its lineup. Fun Channel primarily airs in Bahrain, although it was also available in Chile with the network and programming dubbed into Spanish. The Chilean version of the Fun Channel was launched on June 18, 1995 and closed down in 2000.

List of programmes 
2030 CE
The 3 Friends and Jerry
Ace Ventura: Pet Detective
The Addams Family
Adventures in Odyssey
The Adventures of Don Coyote and Sancho Panda
The Adventures of Gulliver
The Adventures of Rocky and Bullwinkle
The Adventures of Shirley Holmes
Adventures of Sonic the Hedgehog
The Adventures of Swiss Family Robinson
The Adventures of the Black Stallion
The Adventures of the Bush Patrol
The Adventures of the Little Prince
The Adventures of Tintin
ALF: The Animated Series
Alvin and the Chipmunks
Angelina Ballerina
Animal Ark
Animaniacs
Animated Classic Showcase
Anthony Ant
The Anti-Gravity Room
Archibald the Koala
Around the World in 80 Dreams
Art Attack
Atom Ant
A.J.'s Time Travelers
Babar
Baby Bollies
Back to Sherwood
Bad Dog
Being Ian
Batman Beyond
Batman: The Animated Series
Beast Wars: Transformers
The Biskitts
Black Hole High
Bob the Builder
Boston Common
Buford and the Galloping Ghost
Butch Cassidy and the Sundance Kids
California Dreams
Camp Candy
Chuck's Choice
Camp Lazlo
Capertown Cops
Captain Caveman and the Teen Angels
Captain Flamingo
Captain N: The Game Master
Captain Planet and the Planeteers
Captain Zed and the Zee Zone
Care Bears
Cartouche, Prince of the Streets
Casper and Friends
Casper and the Angels
The Centurions
The Challenge of the GoBots
Charlie Horse Music Pizza
Chicken Minute
Chowder
Clifford the Big Red Dog
Clue Club
Comedy Central
The Comic Strip
Count Duckula
Courage the Cowardly Dog
Cow and Chicken
Cybernet
C.B. Bears
C.O.P.S.
Degrassi Junior High
Dennis the Menace
Denver, the Last Dinosaur
Detention
Dexter's Laboratory
Dink, the Little Dinosaur
Dinosaurs
Diplodos
Don Quixote
Don't Blame the Koalas
Dragon Tales
Droopy, Master Detective
The Dukes
Eckhart
Ed, Edd n' Eddy
Eekstravaganza
Eek! the Cat
Explorations
Fangface
Fantastic Max
Fat Albert and the Cosby Kids
Fish Police
The Flintstones
Flipper and Lopaka
For Better or For Worse
Fox's Peter Pan and the Pirates
Frankenstein Jr. and the Impossibles
Freakazoid!
The Fresh Prince of Bel-Air
The Fun Club
The Funky Phantom
The Further Adventures of SuperTed
Gadget and the Gadgetinis
Galaxy Goof-Ups
Garfield and Friends
Get Smart
The Gift
Gilligan's Island
Gloria's House
Going Bananas
Good Times
Grim Tales
Grown Ups
Gulliver's Travels
Hammerman
Hang Time
Happily Ever After: Fairy Tales for Every Child
The Heathcliff and Dingbat Show
Heathcliff & the Catillac Cats
Help!... It's the Hair Bear Bunch!
Hey Dad..!
Heyyy, It's the King!
Histeria!
The Hoobs
Hypernauts
I am Weasel
Inch High Private Eye
Inspector Gadget
Jack Houston's ImagineLand
The Jeffersons
Jim Button and Luke the Engine Driver
Jin Jin and the Panda Patrol
Johnny Bravo
Jonny Quest
Josie and the Pussycats
Journey to the Heart of the World
Justice League
Kate & Allie
The Kids from Room 402
Lady Lovely Locks
The Lampies
Lapitch the Little Shoemaker
Laurel and Hardy
The Legend of the Hidden City
Looney Tunes
Life with Louie
Little Mouse on the Prairie
The Little Rascals
Little Rosey
Little Wizards
The Littles
The Littl' Bits
The Magician
Madison
The Magician's House
Malcolm and Eddie
Marine Boy
The Mary Tyler Moore Show
The Mask: Animated Series
Maxie's World
McGee and Me!
McGruff the Crime Dog
Men Behaving Badly
Mentors
Merrie Melodies
Mike, Lu & Og
Mighty Morphin Power Rangers
Mister Rogers' Neighborhood
Movies, Games and Videos
Mr. Bean
Mr Bogus
Muppets Tonight
My Pet Monster
Mysterious Island
The Mystery of Black Rose Castle
MythQuest
The Naked Truth
The Nanny
Ned's Newt
The New Adventures of Captain Planet
The New Adventures of Gilligan
The New Adventures of Madeline
The New Adventures of Superman
The New Batman Adventures
The New Fred and Barney Show
The New Scooby and Scrappy-Doo Show
The New Shmoo
The New Tomorrow
Noddy's Toyland Adventures
Oswald
Outriders
Pac-Man
Pandamonium
Paw Paws
Pee-wee's Playhouse
Pinky and the Brain
Pinky, Elmyra and the Brain
Pippi Longstocking
The Pirates of Dark Water
Pokémon
Police Academy
Popeye and Son
The Porky Pig Show
Postman Pat
Pound Puppies
The Powerpuff Girls
Princess Sissi
Princess Starla and the Jewel Riders
Princess Tenko
A Pup Named Scooby-Doo
The Puppy's Further Adventures
The Puppy's New Adventures
Rainbow Brite
The Real Adventures of Jonny Quest
Real Kids Real Adventures
ReBoot
The Ren & Stimpy Show
Richie Rich
Richie Rich
Rimba's Island
Rhoda
Road Rovers
The Road Runner Show
Robinson Sucroe
Rocko's Modern Life
Rolie Polie Olie
Roswell Conspiracies: Aliens, Myths and Legends
Rotten Ralph
Saban's Adventures of Peter Pan
Saban's Adventures of Pinocchio
Saban's Adventures of Oliver Twist
Saban's Adventures of the Little Mermaid
Spider Riders
The Secret Saturdays
The Saddle Club
Sanford and Son
Saved by the Bell
Sealab 2020
The Secret Files of the Spy Dogs
Shirt Tales
Silverhawks
Sk8
Skysurfer Strike Force
The Smurfs
Space Ace
Space Ghost
Star Street: The Adventures of the Star Kids
The Super Globetrotters
Super Friends
Superhuman Samurai Syber-Squad
Superman: The Animated Series
Sylvanian Families
Tabaluga
Tales from the Neverending Story
Tattooed Teenage Alien Fighters from Beverly Hills
Taz-Mania
Teenage Mutant Ninja Turtles
Three's Company
Thundarr the Barbarian
ThunderCats
Thunderstone
Tiny Toon Adventures
Titeuf
The Tofus
Tom and Jerry
Tom & Jerry Kids
The Sylvester & Tweety Mysteries
The Tomorrow People
Top Cat
Totally Spies!
Toyota World of Wildlife
Turbo Teen
The Tribe
Twipsy
The Twisted Tales of Felix the Cat
Ultraforce
Ultraman
Valley of the Dinosaurs
Wakey Wakey
A Walk In Your Shoes
Walter Melon
Waynehead
The What a Cartoon! Show
What's with Andy?
Wheelie and the Chopper Bunch
Where's Wally?
The Why Why Family
Wicked!
Widget the World Watcher
Wildfire
The Wizard of Oz
Wacky Races
WKRP in Cincinnati
Women of the House
Woofer & Wimper: Dog Detectives
Wunschpunsch
Yogi Bear
Yogi's Space Race
Yogi's Treasure Hunt
Young Robin Hood
Yo, Yogi!

See also 

Metro Kids

References

External links
 Official Site (Wayback Machine archive)
 Orbit's Official Site (Wayback Machine archive)

Arab mass media
Children's television networks
Defunct television channels
Television channels and stations established in 1994
Television channels and stations established in 1995
Television channels and stations disestablished in 2000
Television channels and stations disestablished in 2010
Television stations in Chile
Television in Bahrain
Mass media in Chile
Television networks in Chile
1995 establishments in Chile
2000 disestablishments in Chile
Spanish-language television stations